Laurence St-Germain (born 30 May 1994) is a Canadian World Cup alpine ski racer, and specializes in the technical events of slalom and giant slalom. She made her World Cup debut in November 2015, and is the current world champion in slalom.

Career
From Saint-Ferréol-les-Neiges, Quebec, St-Germain competed for Canada at the Junior World Championships in 2013; she was 25th in the slalom but failed to finish the second run of the giant slalom on home snow at Mont-Sainte-Anne. She made her World Cup debut in November 2015 in slalom at Aspen, and was 27th. She scored her first World Cup points in November 2017 at Levi with a 17th-place finish in the slalom.

St-Germain made her Olympic debut in 2018, and was 15th in the slalom. At her first World Championships in 2019, she was sixth in the slalom.

St-Germain raced collegiately in the United States for the Catamounts of the University of Vermont, just over the border in Burlington; she was a three-time All-American and the national runner-up in the slalom in 2016.

In January 2022, St-Germain was named to Canada's 2022 Olympic team.

At the 2023 World Championships in Méribel, St-Germain won the gold medal in the slalom.

World Cup results

Season standings

Top ten finishes
0 podiums; 14 top tens

World Championship results

Olympic results

References

External links
 

Laurence St-Germain at Alpine Canada
Laurence St-Germain at University of Vermont Athletics

1994 births
Canadian female alpine skiers
Living people
Alpine skiers at the 2018 Winter Olympics
Alpine skiers at the 2022 Winter Olympics
Olympic alpine skiers of Canada